The Ceará gnateater or Caatinga gnateater (Conopophaga cearae) is a passerine bird of the gnateater family, Conopophagidae. It is found in forest understory and bushes in northeastern Brazil. 

The Ceara gnateater is locally called “cupadente”, or “spitter” in Portuguese due to the sound it produces when it vocalizes.

Appearance 
They are about 11.5 to 14 cm (4.5 to 5.5 in) long.

The Ceará gnateater used to be considered a subspecies of the rufous gnateater (Conopophaga lineata), but recent evidence shows they are distinct species. Although there are no apparent differences in the vocalizations between these species, genetic analysis shows the distinction between the two. They also differ slightly in appearance. Ceará gnateaters are a paler apricot color when compared to the dirty orange of the rufous gnateater. They also lack a white breast patch, and have a brighter crown and shorter tail than the rufous gnatcatcher does.

Distribution and habitat 
Ceará gnateaters are endemic to a small region in northeastern Brazil with upland evergreen forest. They can be found in these Brazilian states: Ceará, Pernambuco, Paraíba, Rio Grande Do Norte, and Alagoas.  They are predominantly found in dense understory where they nest and forage.

Diet 
As their name would imply, Ceara gnateaters are insectivores. They dominate the understory and forage close to the forest floor either under leaf litter or just above the ground. Once prey is captured, such as small arthropods or beetles, they head to the safety of dense underbrush. They prefer to forage alone or with their mate and tend to avoid larger groups. This behavior of group avoidance is not well explained.

Reproduction 
Similar to most gnateaters, this species is monogamous. Pairs remain together throughout the year. Mated-pairs may avoid mixed-species flocks found in the understory.

Courtship involve males erecting their white ear tufts and chasing females while performing simple aerial displays. Male primary feathers are modified to produce specialized sounds while in flight. Both their ear tufts and sound production with their wings can be used for courtship or for territory defense. A pair's territory size may extend to 40m². 

Nest building involves placing twigs and leaves in low branches or shrubs to create a camouflaged cup-nest. The clutch consists of 2 eggs, but it is often that only one survives to fledge. Males aid the females in incubation. Incubating adults attempt to camouflage themselves when predators approach by shrinking into the nest and often rely on shadows to hide their rufous color. Adults will only flee if predators are dangerously close to the nest. Other strategies include females luring predators away using a "broken-wing display" in which they feign an injury to distract away from the nest. This behavior is intensified when nestlings are in later stages of development, such as close to fledging.

Conservation status 
There has been conflicting information on this species endangered status. Its population is considered stable, but there has been a lack of studies regarding actual population numbers. Some sources say its status should be changed to vulnerable due to its restricted range which makes it susceptible to habitat loss.

AQUASIS is a non-profit organization that works in the Brazilian state of Ceara to prevent the extinction of endangered species. Although the Ceara gnateater is not one of their species of focus, this organization works to protect areas where they exist.

References

Ceará gnateater
Birds of the Caatinga
Endemic birds of Brazil
Ceará gnateater
Ceará gnateater